Silver Sky Airlines (Silver Sky Líneas Aéreas S.A.) was a failed scheduled airline project to be based in Mendoza, Argentina. It was founded in 2006 and dissolved again in 2008, without having operated a single revenue flight.

Destinations

Planned destinations included:
Aeroparque (Aeroparque Jorge Newbery)
Córdoba (Ingeniero Aeronáutico Ambrosio L.V. Taravella International Airport)
Mendoza (Governor Francisco Gabrielli International Airport)

Fleet
The Silver Sky Airlines fleet included the following aircraft (at March 2008):
1 Boeing 737-200

References

External links
Official website

Defunct airlines of Argentina
Airlines established in 2006
Airlines disestablished in 2008
2008 disestablishments in Argentina
Argentine companies established in 2006